Chinatown is a common name for an urban enclave with large numbers of Chinese people and/or businesses within a non-Chinese society.

Chinatown may also refer to:

Places
 List of Chinatowns, specific Chinatowns around the world
 Chinatown, Binondo
 Chinatown, Boston
 Chinatown, Brooklyn
 Chinatown, California (disambiguation)
 Chinatown, Chicago
 Chinatown, Cleveland (disambiguation)
 Chinatown, Darwin
 Chinatown, Flushing
 Chinatown, Glasgow
 Chinatown, Honiara
 Chinatown, Honolulu
 Chinatown, Houston
 Chinatown, Johannesburg (disambiguation)
 Chinatown, Lae
 Chinatown, Los Angeles
 Chinatown, Manhattan
 Chinatown, Milan
 Chinatown, Montreal
 Chinatown, Newark, New Jersey
 Chinatown, New York City (disambiguation)
 Chinatown, Philadelphia
 Chinatown (Pittsburgh)
 Chinatown, Portland (disambiguation)
 Chinatown, Queens
 Chinatown, San Francisco (disambiguation)
 Chinatown, South Dakota
 Chinatown, Washington, D.C.
 Chinatown, Wisconsin, an unincorporated community (not a Chinatown)

Arts, entertainment, and media

Films
 China Town (1962 film), an Indian Hindi film
 Chinatown (1974 film), an American film directed by Roman Polanski and starring Jack Nicholson and Faye Dunaway
 36 China Town, a 2006 Indian Hindi film
 China Town (2011 film), an Indian Malayalam film
 Chinatown, My Chinatown (film), a 1929 animated short film which was presented by Max Fleischer and directed by Dave Fleischer
 Captured in Chinatown, a 1935 American film directed by Elmer Clifton

Games
 Grand Theft Auto: Chinatown Wars, a 2009 video game

Music

Artists
 Chinatown (band), a Francophone pop band from Montreal, Canada

Albums
 Chinatown (The Be Good Tanyas album), 2003
 Chinatown (Thin Lizzy album), released in 1980

Songs
 "Chinatown, My Chinatown", a 1910 song, performed by Louis Armstrong and others, considered a standard of Dixieland music
 "Chinatown" (The Move song), 1971
 "Chinatown" (Liam Gallagher song), 2017
 "Chinatown" (Bleachers song), 2020
 "Chinatown", a song by Mykki Blanco from the 2012 album Mykki Blanco & the Mutant Angels
 "Chinatown", a song by Destroyer from the 2011 album Kaputt
 "Chinatown", a song by The Doobie Brothers from the 1977 album Livin' on the Fault Line 
 "Chinatown", a song by The Felice Brothers from the 2014 album Favorite Waitress
 "Chinatown", a song by The Greg Kihn Band from the 1978 album Next of Kihn
 "Chinatown", a song by Joe Jackson from the 1982 album Night and Day
 "Chinatown", a song by Jets to Brazil from the 1998 album Orange Rhyming Dictionary
 "Chinatown", a song by Luna from the 1995 album Penthouse
 "Chinatown", a song by The Reivers from the 1991 album Pop Beloved
 "Chinatown", a song by Thin Lizzy from the 1980 album Chinatown
 "Chinatown", a song by Toto from the 2015 album Toto XIV
 "Chinatown", a song by Judie Tzuke from the 1980 album Sports Car
 "China Town", a song by Van Halen from the 2012 album A Different Kind of Truth
 "Chinatown", a song by Wild Nothing from the 2010 album Gemini
 "Chinatown", a song by John Zorn from the 1990 album Naked City

Television
 "Chinatown" (Entourage), a 2005 episode of the TV series Entourage
 "Chinatown" (Space Ghost Coast to Coast), a television episode

Transportation
 Chinatown (Los Angeles Metro station), a light rail station on the Los Angeles County Metro Rail system
 Chinatown (MBTA station), a subway station in Boston, Massachusetts
 Chinatown (SEPTA Broad Street Line station), a subway station in Philadelphia, Pennsylvania
 Chinatown MRT station, a Mass Rapid Transit station in Singapore
 Chinatown Station (disambiguation), various stations containing the name Chinatown
 Chinatown station (Muni Metro), a subway station in San Francisco, California

Other
 Angel of Chinatown, nickname of Rose Livingston, an American suffragette